Chris Campbell (born 20 November 1975) is an Australian professional golfer.

Campbell plays on the Japan Golf Tour, where he was won once.

Campbell's sister, Nikki, plays on the LPGA of Japan Tour and the ALPG Tour.

Amateur wins
1999 New South Wales Amateur
2002 Lake Macquarie Amateur

Professional wins (3)

Japan Golf Tour wins (1)

Japan Golf Tour playoff record (1–0)

Japan Challenge Tour wins (2)

Results in major championships

CUT = missed the halfway cut
Note: Campbell only played in The Open Championship.

Team appearances
Amateur
Australian Men's Interstate Teams Matches (representing New South Wales): 1999, 2000, 2001, 2002 (winners)

External links

Australian male golfers
Japan Golf Tour golfers
Sportspeople from Canberra
1975 births
Living people